Dugri is a village in the Indian state of Punjab. 

Dugri is clustered around the village center Gurudwara Damdama Sahib, which is the holiest Gurdwara of Sikhism in the neighborhood. The Gurudwara was established after Guru Nanak Dev Ji and Guru Hargobind ji visited. It has temples such as Sheetla Mata Mandir situated right near the entrance to the village. 

Dugri is the birthplace of Punjabi singer Amar Singh Chamkila.

The village falls under ward 61 administered by councillor Rakhwinder Singh.

References

External links
 Image of Dugri

  
Villages in Ludhiana district